Acasis is a genus of moths in the family Geometridae erected by Philogène Auguste Joseph Duponchel in 1845.

Species
 Acasis appensata (Eversmann, 1842)
 Acasis viretata (Hübner, 1799) – yellow-barred brindle
 Acasis viridata (Packard, 1873) – olive-and-black carpet

References

Trichopterygini
Geometridae genera